Del Miller (born November 6, 1950) is a former American football coach. He served as the head football coach at Southwest Missouri State University—now known as Missouri State University—from 1995 to 1998, compiling a record of 21–23. Miller was a longtime assistant to Kansas State University under head coach Bill Snyder. He was the first assistant hired by Snyder in 1989, and has served three separate stints with the program. Miller and Snyder had previously coached together as assistants at the University of Iowa under Hayden Fry. Miller shared the offensive coordinator duties at Kansas State with Dana Dimel from 2009 to 2016.

Miller graduated from Iowa Valley High School in 1968.

Head coaching record

College

References

1950 births
Living people
American football defensive backs
American football fullbacks
American football linebackers
Central Dutch football players
Iowa Hawkeyes football coaches
Kansas State Wildcats football coaches
Missouri State Bears football coaches
Oklahoma State Cowboys football coaches
San Diego State Aztecs football coaches
High school football coaches in Iowa
People from Marengo, Iowa
Players of American football from Iowa